The 1994 Minnesota House of Representatives election was held in the U.S. state of Minnesota on November 8, 1994, to elect members to the House of Representatives of the 79th Minnesota Legislature. A primary election was held on September 13, 1994.

The Minnesota Democratic–Farmer–Labor Party (DFL) won a majority of seats, remaining the majority party, followed by the Independent-Republicans of Minnesota. The new Legislature convened on January 3, 1995.

Results

See also
 Minnesota Senate election, 1992
 Minnesota gubernatorial election, 1994

References

1994 Minnesota elections
Minnesota House of Representatives elections
Minnesota